Asphodel Ltd ( Asphodel Records) was a San Francisco-based independent record label founded by musician Mitzi Johnson and Naut Humon in 1992.  The label is named after the mythological flower that grows along the banks of the River Styx in Hades.  The label had shut down as of January 2011.

Asphodel has a diverse catalog of releases with a prominent experimental thread in the genres of turntablism, electronica, ambient, illbient, electroacoustic, trip hop, spoken word, noise, techno, and lounge.

History

The label's first release was the self-titled debut by Johnson's band, Blue Rubies.

Naut Humon became the official Asphodel head of A&R in 1994.  Erik Gilbert, once served as the label's General Manager, before becoming the Vice President of Content at the Independent Online Distribution Alliance before Sony restructured to become The Orchard.

Asphodel was named as one of the "top 10 independent labels in the world" by Rolling Stone magazine in 1998.

Speaking on the legacy of Asphodel, [Erik] Gilbert underlined its uncompromising stance and approach: "Incredible artists, incredible albums. I am honoured and proud to have been involved with them. Nothing has since come close." For [Gregor] Asch, without Naut there would be no DJ Olive as we knew him and perhaps no illbient. "The label is Naut’s legacy really," he admits. "Quality sampling from emerging sounds on the meridian between the underground and the popular. A world class grasp of production and mastering while always pushing the boundaries of a surround performance experience."

As of January 2011, a message on the asphodel.com last snapshot reads, "Asphodel is now closed. Thank you for the love and support. Mitzi Johnson, San Francisco
January, 2011".

Artists

AGF.3 + SUE.C
Alexander Rishaug
Ann Magnuson
antimatter
Badawi
Biosphere
Blue Rubies
Broker/Dealer
Byzar
Christian Marclay
Curtis Roads
Daniel Menche
David Darling
Diamanda Galas
DJ Spooky
Fe-Mail
Fires Were Shot
Gregory Lenczycki
Iannis Xenakis
Invisibl Skratch Piklz
Iso Orchestra
Janek Schaefer
Jeff Greinke
John Cage
John Ward
Ken Nordine
KK Null
Laminar
Li Alin
Martin Ng, Oren Ambarchi, Tina Frank, Robin Fox
Maryanne Amacher
Mix Master Mike
Naut Humon
Otomo Yoshihide
Phil Crumar
Ray Guillette
Reinhold Friedl
Rhythm & Sound
Richard Devine
Robert Rich
Ryuichi Sakamoto
Single Cell Orchestra
Steve Roach
Sub Dub
The-Allies
Thomas Dimuzio
Tipsy
Ulf Langheinrich
Vidna Obmana
We™
World Standard
X-Ecutioners
Yasunao Tone
zeitkratzer
[The User]

See also
 Naut Humon
 List of record labels

References

External links
 Last snapshot of Asphodel.com
 Asphodel's MySpace Page
 Asphodel on YouTube

American independent record labels
Companies based in San Francisco
Music of the San Francisco Bay Area
1992 establishments in California